Prodiamine is a preemergent herbicide of the dinitroaniline class.  Prodiamine is used with crops such as soybeans, alfalfa, cotton, and ornamental crops. Prodiamine inhibits the formation of microtubules.

Prodiamine was developed by Sandoz AG and marketed beginning in 1987.

Prodiamine can be obtained starting from 2,4-dichlorobenzotrifluoride.

References

Herbicides
Trifluoromethyl compounds
Anilines
Nitrobenzenes